The Rennert railroad accident occurred in Rennert, North Carolina on 16 December 1943. 74 people were killed on the Atlantic Coast Line when the northbound Tamiami Champion struck the derailed rear three cars of its southbound counterpart. It remains the deadliest train wreck ever in North Carolina.

Derailment
The southbound train comprised 18 cars hauled by EMD E6 diesel-electric units 515-753-514. It departed Fayetteville 20.5 miles north of Rennert at 12:25 am and was running over an hour late at a speed of 85 mph when the rear three cars derailed and became separated from the rest of the train.

Although they remained upright, the rear two cars - a dining car and a Pullman sleeping car - fouled the northbound track. The enginemen became aware of a problem when the emergency brakes were automatically applied and the front part of the train came to a halt some nearly half a mile beyond the derailed cars, at around 12:50 am.  The brakeman (traveling in the derailed rearmost car) evacuated the passengers from these cars and then showed a light to inform the men working the front of the train that it had parted.

A passenger asked whether he would protect the northbound track but the flagman said that the crew in the front of the train would do so; the brakeman then proceeded north to provide flag protection.

Meanwhile, the enginemen, investigating the cause of the brake application found that the third car had separated from the second. They were still unaware of the derailment further back. The conductor (in the 13th car) saw the light but assumed it had been dropped from the rearmost car. The engineer said that soon after the train stopped he instructed the fireman to provide flag protection on the northbound track; whilst he attempted to repair the broken coupling.

Collision
The fireman proceeded southwards; when he saw the approaching headlight of the oncoming northbound train he attempted to light a fusee but slipped and fell on the icy ballast. He waved stop signals but did not appear to be seen. The northbound train was composed of 16 cars hauled by EMD E6 diesel electric units 506–503, and EMD E3A unit 500 and was travelling at 80 mph when it approached the stationary southbound train.

The engineer did not see a warning signal until he had passed the front of it; then he saw stop signals (being given by a passenger) 1000 feet ahead at the same time as he saw the derailed cars. Despite applying the emergency brakes a collision was inevitable.

As many as 74 passengers were killed (some sources say 72); there was only one fatality on the halted southbound train. Most of the deaths were servicemen on the northbound train, traveling home for the holidays. According to the official report 'the third car stopped on top of the second car', with most fatalities occurring in these two cars.

Causes
Although the initial derailment was caused by a rail breaking beneath the train, the subsequent collision could have been prevented if the crew had obeyed operating rules that state that a thorough inspection of the train be made in the 40 minutes after the initial derailment. Adequate train protection involving 'torpedoes' would then have prevented the disastrous collision.

References

Derailments in the United States
Railway accidents in 1943
1943 in North Carolina
Rail transportation in North Carolina
Accidents and incidents involving Atlantic Coast Line Railroad
Robeson County, North Carolina
Transportation disasters in North Carolina
December 1943 events
Train collisions in the United States
Railway accidents and incidents in North Carolina